Trichoschoenus is a genus of flowering plants belonging to the family Cyperaceae.

Its native range is Madagascar.

Species:
 Trichoschoenus bosseri J.Raynal

References

Cyperaceae
Cyperaceae genera